The Ministry of Finance and Planning is a ministry of the Government of South Sudan. This ministry  was first headed by Honourable David Deng Athorbie after the country gained her independence from Sudan in 2011.

However, the ministry of Finance and economic planning has issued statement in 2022 stopping the issuance of bank overdraft and will prefer injecting more U$D into the market.

Ministers of Finance in before independence
Ministers responsible for finance in Southern Sudan autonomous region.

Ministers of Finance and Economic Planning since 2011
Ministers responsible for finance after independence since July 2011.

See also
 Bank of South Sudan

References

Finance and Economic Planning
South Sudan
South Sudan, Finance and Economic Planning
2011 establishments in South Sudan
South Sudan